The Unbearable Lightness of Being is a 1988 American romantic drama film, an adaptation of the 1984 novel of the same name by Milan Kundera. It was directed by Philip Kaufman, who co-wrote the screenplay with Jean-Claude Carrière, and stars Daniel Day-Lewis, Juliette Binoche and Lena Olin. The film portrays Czechoslovak artistic and intellectual life during the Prague Spring, and the effect on the main characters of the communist repression that resulted from the Warsaw Pact invasion of Czechoslovakia in 1968.

Plot
Tomas, a successful brain surgeon in communist Czechoslovakia, is pursuing an affair with Sabina, an equally carefree artist in Prague. Tomas takes a trip to a spa town to conduct a specialized surgery. There he encounters dissatisfied waitress Tereza, who desires intellectual stimulation. She later tracks him down in Prague and moves in with him, complicating Tomas's affairs.

Tomas asks Sabina to help Tereza find work as a photographer. Tereza is both fascinated and jealous when she grasps that Sabina and Tomas are lovers, but nevertheless still develops an affectionate friendship with Sabina. Tomas marries Tereza in a simple ceremony, with both perpetually laughing. She continues to be distressed by Tomas's promiscuity, and though she considers leaving him, she becomes more attached when the Soviet Army invades Czechoslovakia. Amid the confusion, Tereza photographs demonstrations against the Soviet forces, then hands the rolls of film to foreigners to smuggle to the West. Unwilling to face the stultifying reality that is replacing the Prague Spring, Tomas, Sabina, and Tereza flee Czechoslovakia for Switzerland; Sabina leaves first, later followed by the hesitant Tomas and Tereza.

In Geneva, Sabina meets Franz, a married university professor; they begin a love affair. He eventually decides to abandon his wife and family for her. After hearing his plans, Sabina abandons him, feeling he would emotionally weigh her down. Meanwhile, Tereza and Tomas attempt to adapt to Switzerland, but Tereza finds the people inhospitable. When she discovers that Tomas continues to womanize, she leaves him and returns to Czechoslovakia. Upset by her leaving, Tomas follows Tereza to Czechoslovakia, where his passport is confiscated, preventing him from leaving again; his return elates Tereza, and they are reunited.

Tomas attempts to resume his practice; however, a scathing article he wrote before the invasion, criticizing the Soviet-backed Czech régime, has rendered him a political dissident. The régime demands his signature to a letter repudiating the article, claiming that Tomas's article fueled anti-communist sentiment. Tomas refuses and is apparently blacklisted from practicing medicine. He finds work as a window washer and continues to womanize, seducing the daughter of a high-ranking official.

As a waitress, Tereza meets an engineer who propositions her. Aware of Tomas's infidelities, she engages in a single, passionless sexual liaison with the engineer. Remorseful, she fears the engineer might have been a secret agent for the régime, who might denounce her and Tomas. She contemplates suicide at a canal bank; by chance, Tomas passes by Tereza and woos her back.

Stressed by city life, Tereza convinces Tomas to leave Prague for the country; they go to a village where an old patient of Tomas's welcomes them. In the village, they live an idyllic life, far from the political intrigues of Prague. In contrast, Sabina has gone to the US, where she continues her detached bohemian lifestyle. Later, Sabina is shocked by a letter that informs her Tereza and Tomas have been in a fatal automobile accident.

The movie ends with a short scene of Tomas and Tereza driving down the country road in the rain just before their accident, and Tomas peacefully expresses to Tereza how happy he is.

Cast

Production
The film was an American production with an American director, Philip Kaufman, but it features a largely European cast. It was filmed in France; in the scenes depicting the Soviet invasion, archival footage is combined with new material shot in Lyon. The scene in which Tomas has sex with a woman while cleaning windows was shot in the then unrestored Hôtel de Beauvais in the 4th arrondissement of Paris (now the Administrative Appeal Court).

Adaptation
Kundera served as an active consultant during the making of the film. Kundera wrote the poem that Tomas whispers into Tereza's ear as she is falling asleep specifically for the film.

However, in a note to the Czech edition of the book, Kundera remarks that the movie had very little to do with the spirit either of the novel or the characters in it. In the same note Kundera goes on to say that after this experience he no longer allows any adaptations of his work. Many critics have focused on how much of the book was successfully captured, or could be captured, on film; however, some commentators, such as Cattrysse Patrick, have argued that the film must be viewed in a different light, with the book as only one source of inspiration.

Reception
The film garnered high praise from critics. It holds an approval rating of 85% on the review aggregator website Rotten Tomatoes, based on 27 reviews. The website's consensus reads, "Exploring sexual mores against the backdrop of real-life social upheaval, The Unbearable Lightness of Being artfully blends the political and the erotic."

The film was nominated for two Academy Awards: Jean-Claude Carrière and Philip Kaufman for Best Adapted Screenplay and Sven Nykvist for Best Cinematography. The film was listed 87th by the American Film Institute in its 2002 list AFI's 100 Years...100 Passions.

Home media
A digitally restored version of the film was released on DVD by The Criterion Collection in November 1999. The release includes audio commentary by director Philip Kaufman, co-writer Jean-Claude Carrière, editor Walter Murch and actress Lena Olin. It was re-released on DVD by Warner Home Video as a 2-disc special edition on February 28, 2006.

Soundtrack

The film makes extensive use of classical pieces by Czech composer Leoš Janáček, especially his "On an Overgrown Path" piano compositions. It also features a performance of the Beatles' song "Hey Jude" by Marta Kubišová in Czech as well as the traditional Czechoslovakian folk song "Joj, Joj, Joj", performed by Jarmila Šuláková and Vojtěch Jochec.

Preservation
The Unbearable Lightness of Being was preserved by the Academy Film Archive in 2019.

References

External links
 
 

The Unbearable Lightness of Being an essay by Michael Sragow at the Criterion Collection
 Movie Stills at Virtual History
 Excerpt about the film by film scholar Annette Insdorf from her book, Philip Kaufman

1988 films
Films with atheism-related themes
1988 drama films
1980s English-language films
American erotic drama films
Films based on Czech novels
Films based on French novels
Films directed by Philip Kaufman
Films set in 1968
Films set in Switzerland
Films shot in Switzerland
Orion Pictures films
American political drama films
Films set in Prague
Films shot in France
Films shot in the Czech Republic
Films produced by Saul Zaentz
Films critical of communism
Films with screenplays by Jean-Claude Carrière
Films whose writer won the Best Adapted Screenplay BAFTA Award
Fiction about invasions
1980s erotic drama films
1980s political drama films
National Society of Film Critics Award for Best Film winners
1980s American films